General Rains may refer to:

Gabriel J. Rains (1803–1881), Confederate States Army brigadier general, inventor of the modern anti-personnel mine
George Washington Rains (1817–1898), Confederate States Army brigadier general (unconfirmed)
James Edwards Rains (1833–1862), Confederate States Army brigadier general 
James S. Rains (1817–1880), Missouri State Guard brigadier general

See also
Julius Raines (1825–1909), British Army general